is a Japanese alpine skier. He competed in slalom and giant slalom at the 1992, 1994, 1998, and 2002 Winter Olympics.

References

External links
 Official JOC profile 
 

1970 births
Living people
Japanese male alpine skiers
Olympic alpine skiers of Japan
Alpine skiers at the 1992 Winter Olympics
Alpine skiers at the 1994 Winter Olympics
Alpine skiers at the 1998 Winter Olympics
Alpine skiers at the 2002 Winter Olympics
Asian Games medalists in alpine skiing
Asian Games gold medalists for Japan
Alpine skiers at the 1990 Asian Winter Games
Alpine skiers at the 2003 Asian Winter Games
People from Hirosaki
Medalists at the 1990 Asian Winter Games
Medalists at the 2003 Asian Winter Games
Universiade medalists in alpine skiing
Universiade gold medalists for Japan
Competitors at the 1991 Winter Universiade